Rudnytsia is an urban-type settlement in Tulchyn Raion of Vinnytsia Oblast in Ukraine. Rudnytsia belongs to Pishchanka settlement hromada, one of the hromadas of Ukraine. Population: 

Until 18 July 2020, Rudnytsia belonged to Pishchanka Raion. The raion was abolished in July 2020 as part of the administrative reform of Ukraine, which reduced the number of raions of Vinnytsia Oblast to six. The area of Pishchanka Raion was merged into Tulchyn Raion.

Economy

Transportation
Rudnytsia railway station is located on the railway connecting Zhmerynka with Odessa and Pervomaisk. Rudnytsia is also a terminal station of a narrow-gauge railway line connecting it with Haivoron via Bershad. There is passenger traffic through the station.

The settlement is connected by road with Haisyn and Bershad, where it has further connections with Ukrainian road network.

References

Urban-type settlements in Tulchyn Raion